Orville Johnson is an American resonator guitar player born in 1953 in Edwardsville, Illinois, United States. He came up in the St. Louis, Missouri music scene. A frequent session musician, he also has released a number of solo and group albums. He has appeared on the radio show A Prairie Home Companion and on The Tonight Show with Jay Leno on television.

Johnson made his film debut in Georgia, appearing as a musician.

He is a singer, instrumentalist, record producer, songwriter, session player, and teacher. As his entry in the Encyclopedia of Northwest Music (Sasquatch Press, 1999) states, he has become a vital figure on the Northwest music scene. He has appeared on over 400 albums, movie and video soundtracks, and commercials, produced 22 albums for other musicians, and hosted a roots music radio show.

Johnson has taught at the Puget Sound Guitar Workshop as well as the International Guitar Seminar, Port Townsend Blues Workshop, Euro-Blues Workshop, and B.C. Bluegrass Workshop.

Discography

Albums
 Music by A Country Band (1973)
 The World According to Orville (1990)
 Orville Johnson and Scott Weiskopf (1993)
 Kings of Mongrel Folk (1997) with Mark Graham
 Blueprint for the Blues (1998)
 Slide & Joy (1999)
 Freehand (2003)
 Still Goin' Strong (2004) with Mark Graham
 Together in Las Vegas (2005) with John Cephas and Woody Mann
 Deceiving Blues (2006) with John Miller and Grant Dermody
 The Sweeter the Juice (2009) with Laura Love
 Southern Filibuster: A Tribute to Tut Taylor (2010) produced by Jerry Douglas
 "We Heard the Voice of a Pork Chop" (2012) as Johnson, Miller & Dermody
 "Bitter Truth" (2013) as The Kings of Mongrel Folk

Instructional
 Intro To Lead Guitar (DVD)
 Resophonic Guitar for Beginners, Vols. 1&2 (DVDs)
 Tips,Tricks, and Techniques for Dobro, Vols. 1&2 (DVDs)
 Getting Started in Open D Tuning (DVD)
 Getting Started with Bottleneck Slide Guitar'' (DVD)

References

External links

1953 births
Living people
Musicians from Seattle
American blues guitarists
Blues musicians from Illinois
American folk guitarists
American male guitarists
People from Edwardsville, Illinois
Guitarists from Illinois
Guitarists from Washington (state)
20th-century American guitarists
20th-century American male musicians